The Armory of the First Corps of Cadets is a historic armory at 97–105 Arlington Street and 130 Columbus Avenue in Boston, Massachusetts.  The four-story granite structure was designed by William Gibbons Preston and built beginning in 1891 and finished in 1897. Due to political unrest during the period, the building was designed to withstand mob violence.  Its most prominent feature is its six-story tower.  It is built in the Romanesque Revival style. The building's staircases are built by the Guastavino system, as are some tower vaults.

In the late 1960s, the University of Massachusetts Boston leased the building and converted it into the university's first library. The building was listed on the National Register of Historic Places in 1973 and designated as a Boston Landmark by the Boston Landmarks Commission in 1977.  It was known as the Park Plaza Castle and owned by the adjacent Boston Park Plaza, which used it as a banquet facility up until 2014. Currently managed by another company, the venue space is now referred to as the "Castle at Park Plaza."

See also
 First Corps of Cadets (Massachusetts)
 National Register of Historic Places listings in northern Boston, Massachusetts

References

External links
 
 City of Boston, Boston Landmarks Commission Armory of the First Corps of Cadets Study Report

Infrastructure completed in 1897
Castles in Massachusetts
Buildings and structures in Boston
Armories on the National Register of Historic Places in Massachusetts
Armories in Massachusetts
National Register of Historic Places in Boston
Landmarks in Back Bay, Boston